Charles Latham may refer to:
 Charles Latham (1816–1907), English physician
 Charles Latham (1847-1912), English photographer
 Sir Charles George Latham (1882-1968), Australian politician
 Charles Latham, 1st Baron Latham (1888-1970), British politician